Victalimulus is an extinct genus of  horseshoe crab, from Early Cretaceous (Aptian) Koonwarra Fossil Beds in eastern Victoria, Australia. The single species, V. mcqueeni, was discovered by James McQueen who was encouraged by Leon Costermans to take it to the Museum of Victoria. Unlike modern species of horseshoe crab, it was likely native to freshwater.

References

Xiphosura
Early Cretaceous arthropods
Cretaceous animals of Australia